Thorp Records is an independent record label focusing originally and primarily on hardcore punk, based out of Pennsylvania.

Bands 

 Above This World
 All Else Failed
 Angel City Outcasts
 Ashers
 Awkward Thought
 Benumb
 Bionic
 Blood for Blood
 The Boils
 Brain Failure
 Breakdown
 Bulldog Courage
 Burning Bridges
 Clenched Fist
 Comin' Correct
 Conviction
 Crash and Burn
 Dead Serious
 Deluge
 Diehard Youth
 Discipline
 Drowningman
 Down to Nothing
 The Ducky Boys
 Edgewise
 Emmanuel Seven
 Fall River
 The Final Burden
 Final Plan
 Forced Reality
 Fordirelifesake
 Forever Is Forgotten
 Gone Without Trace
 Hell Within
 How It Ends
 I Defy
 Ironbound
 Knuckledust
 Mad Sin
 Madball
 Mushmouth
 My Luck
 My Revenge
 My Turn to Win
 Natchez Shakers
 North Side Kings
 On the Outside
 Out Cold
 Out to Win
 Paint the Town Red
 Power Point
 Premonitions of War
 Pride Kills
 Punishment
 Ramallah
 Reaching Hand
 Refuse Resist
 Ryker's
 Scars of Tomorrow
 Sheer Terror
 Skare Tactic
 Slapshot
 Stampin' Ground
 Striking Distance
 Sugar Daddie
 Twenty Bulls Each
 Two Minutes Hate
 Voorhees
 The Wednesdays
 The Young and the Useless

External links 
 Official site
 Discogs
 AllMusic

References 

Hardcore punk
American record labels